"Last of the American Girls" is a song written and recorded by American rock band Green Day and is the tenth track and fifth and last single from their eighth studio album 21st Century Breakdown. It peaked at number 26 on the US alternative rock chart. The song hit radio on May 11, 2010.

In its album review, Rolling Stone wrote: "'Last of the American Girls' comes on as a fabulous left-wing love song to a rebel girl — when Armstrong sings, 'She won't cooperate,' he's giving her the highest compliment he can imagine."

The song is playable as DLC in the video game Green Day: Rock Band.

Music video
The music video for "Last of the American Girls" was directed by Marc Webb and released to MTV on April 1, 2010. The video alternates between the band playing in a desert and the character Gloria (Lisa Stelly) who appears in the video for "21 Guns", and is also a protagonist in the story of the album 21st Century Breakdown. Gloria is shown taking part in everyday activities, such as brushing her teeth, watching television, and cleaning her nails.

It is Green Day's fourth video to feature touring guitarist Jason White performing with the band, following "21 Guns", "Wake Me Up When September Ends" and "Working Class Hero".

Credits and Personnel
Songwriting: Billie Joe Armstrong, Mike Dirnt, and Tré Cool
Production: Butch Vig and Green Day

Track listing

Chart performance

References

2008 songs
2010 singles
Green Day songs
Songs written by Billie Joe Armstrong
Song recordings produced by Butch Vig
Music videos directed by Marc Webb
Reprise Records singles
Songs written by Tré Cool
Songs written by Mike Dirnt